The Unthinkable (Polish: O czym się nie myśli) is a 1926 Polish silent drama film directed by Edward Puchalski and starring Józef Węgrzyn, Igo Sym and Mira Zimińska. The film marked the debut of Jan Kiepura who went on to international success. It was made as a follow-up to the 1924 film The Unspeakable by the same director.

The film's sets were designed by the art director Józef Galewski.

Cast
 Józef Węgrzyn as Wierciak 
 Maria Modzelewska as Zofia Wierciakówna 
 Mania Malukiewicz as Jadzia Wierciakówna 
 Igo Sym as Orlicz, composer 
 Władysław Grabowski as Borski, violinist 
 Mira Zimińska as Wanda, pianist 
 Stefan Szwarc as Czernik 
 Władysław Walter as Knajpiarz 
 Witold Roland as Taki sobie gosc 
 Ignacy Miastecki as Felczer 
 Janusz Star as Slepy inspicjent 
 Jan Kiepura
 Józef Sliwicki
 Paweł Owerłło
 Zofia Czaplińska

References

Bibliography
 Skaff, Sheila. The Law of the Looking Glass: Cinema in Poland, 1896-1939. Ohio University Press, 2008.

External links

1926 films
1926 drama films
Polish drama films
Films directed by Edward Puchalski
Polish silent films
1920s Polish-language films
Polish black-and-white films
Silent drama films